In the field of complex analysis in mathematics, the Cauchy–Riemann equations, named after Augustin Cauchy and Bernhard Riemann, consist of a system of two partial differential equations which, together with certain continuity and differentiability criteria, form a necessary and sufficient condition for a complex function to be holomorphic (complex differentiable).  This system of equations first appeared in the work of Jean le Rond d'Alembert. Later, Leonhard Euler connected this system to the analytic functions. Cauchy then used these equations to construct his theory of functions. Riemann's dissertation on the theory of functions appeared in 1851.

Typically u and v are taken to be the real and imaginary parts respectively of a complex-valued function of a single complex variable , . The existence of partial derivatives satisfying the Cauchy–Riemann equations there doesn't ensure complex differentiability:  and  must be real differentiable, which is a stronger condition than the existence of the partial derivatives, but in general, weaker than continuous differentiability.

Holomorphic functions are analytic and vice versa. This means that, in complex analysis, a function that is complex-differentiable in a whole domain (holomorphic) is the same as an analytic function. This is not true for real differentiable functions.

Simple example 
Suppose that . The complex-valued function  is differentiable at any point  in the complex plane. 

The real part  and the imaginary part  are

and their partial derivatives are

Interpretation and reformulation 
The equations are one way of looking at the condition on a function to be differentiable in the sense of complex analysis: in other words they encapsulate the notion of function of a complex variable by means of conventional differential calculus. In the theory there are several other major ways of looking at this notion, and the translation of the condition into other language is often needed.

Conformal mappings 

First, the Cauchy–Riemann equations may be written in complex form

In this form, the equations correspond structurally to the condition that the Jacobian matrix is of the form

A matrix of this form is the matrix representation of a complex number. Geometrically, such a matrix is always the composition of a rotation with a scaling, and in particular preserves angles. Consequently, a function satisfying the Cauchy–Riemann equations, with a nonzero derivative, preserves the angle between curves in the plane. That is, the Cauchy–Riemann equations are the conditions for a function to be conformal.

Moreover, because the composition of a conformal transformation with another conformal transformation is also conformal, the composition of a solution of the Cauchy–Riemann equations with a conformal map must itself solve the Cauchy–Riemann equations. Thus the Cauchy–Riemann equations are conformally invariant.

Complex differentiability 
Suppose that

is a function of a complex number .

provided this limit exists.

If this limit exists, then it may be computed by taking the limit as  along the real axis or imaginary axis; in either case it should give the same result.  Approaching along the real axis, one finds

On the other hand, approaching along the imaginary axis,

The equality of the derivative of  taken along the two axes is

which are the Cauchy–Riemann equations (2) at the point .

Indeed, following Rudin, suppose f is a complex function defined in an open set .

Defining the two Wirtinger derivatives as

in the limit  the above equality can be written as

Now consider the potential values of  when the limit is taken at the origin. For z along the real line,  so that . But this is exactly the Cauchy–Riemann equations, thus f is differentiable at z0 if and only if the Cauchy–Riemann equations hold at z0.

Independence of the complex conjugate 
The above proof suggests another interpretation of the Cauchy–Riemann equations.  The complex conjugate of z, denoted , is defined by

for real x and y. The Cauchy–Riemann equations can then be written as a single equation

by using the Wirtinger derivative with respect to the conjugate variable. In this form, the Cauchy–Riemann equations can be interpreted as the statement that f is independent of the variable . As such, we can view analytic functions as true functions of one complex variable as opposed to complex functions of two real variables.

Physical interpretation 

A standard physical interpretation of the Cauchy–Riemann equations going back to Riemann's work on function theory is that u represents a velocity potential of an incompressible steady fluid flow in the plane, and v is its stream function.  Suppose that the pair of (twice continuously differentiable) functions  satisfies the Cauchy–Riemann equations.  We will take u to be a velocity potential, meaning that we imagine a flow of fluid in the plane such that the velocity vector of the fluid at each point of the plane is equal to the gradient of u, defined by

By differentiating the Cauchy–Riemann equations a second time, one shows that u solves Laplace's equation:

That is, u is a harmonic function.  This means that the divergence of the gradient is zero, and so the fluid is incompressible.

The function v also satisfies the Laplace equation, by a similar analysis.  Also, the Cauchy–Riemann equations imply that the dot product .  This implies that the gradient of u must point along the  curves; so these are the streamlines of the flow.  The  curves are the equipotential curves of the flow.

Near points where the gradient of u (or, equivalently, v) is not zero, these families form an orthogonal family of curves. At the points where , the stationary points of the flow, the equipotential curves of  intersect. The streamlines also intersect at the same point, bisecting the angles formed by the equipotential curves.

Harmonic vector field 
Another interpretation of the Cauchy–Riemann equations can be found in Pólya & Szegő.  Suppose that u and v satisfy the Cauchy–Riemann equations in an open subset of R2, and consider the vector field

regarded as a (real) two-component vector.  Then the second Cauchy–Riemann equation asserts that  is irrotational (its curl is 0):

The first Cauchy–Riemann equation asserts that the vector field is solenoidal (or divergence-free):

Owing respectively to Green's theorem and the divergence theorem, such a field is necessarily a conservative one, and it is free from sources or sinks, having net flux equal to zero through any open domain without holes.  (These two observations combine as real and imaginary parts in Cauchy's integral theorem.) In fluid dynamics, such a vector field is a potential flow.  In magnetostatics, such vector fields model static magnetic fields on a region of the plane containing no current.  In electrostatics, they model static electric fields in a region of the plane containing no electric charge.

This interpretation can equivalently be restated in the language of differential forms.  The pair u,v satisfy the Cauchy–Riemann equations if and only if the one-form  is both closed and coclosed (a harmonic differential form).

Preservation of complex structure 
Another formulation of the Cauchy–Riemann equations involves the complex structure in the plane, given by

This is a complex structure in the sense that the square of J is the negative of the 2×2 identity matrix: .  As above, if u(x,y),v(x,y) are two functions in the plane, put

The Jacobian matrix of f is the matrix of partial derivatives

Then the pair of functions u, v satisfies the Cauchy–Riemann equations if and only if the 2×2 matrix Df commutes with J.

This interpretation is useful in symplectic geometry, where it is the starting point for the study of pseudoholomorphic curves.

Other representations 
Other representations of the Cauchy–Riemann equations occasionally arise in other coordinate systems.  If (1a) and (1b) hold for a differentiable pair of functions u and v, then so do

for any coordinate system  such that the pair (∇n, ∇s) is orthonormal and positively oriented.  As a consequence, in particular,  in the system of coordinates given by the polar representation , the equations then take the form

Combining these into one equation for  gives

for some given functions  and  defined in an open subset of R2.  These equations are usually combined into a single equation

where f = u + iv and 𝜑 = (α + iβ)/2.

If 𝜑 is Ck, then the inhomogeneous equation is explicitly solvable in any bounded domain D, provided 𝜑 is continuous on the closure of D.  Indeed, by the Cauchy integral formula,

for all ζ ∈ D.

Generalizations

Goursat's theorem and its generalizations 

Suppose that  is a complex-valued function which is differentiable as a function .  Then Goursat's theorem asserts that f is analytic in an open complex domain Ω if and only if it satisfies the Cauchy–Riemann equation in the domain. In particular, continuous differentiability of f need not be assumed.

The hypotheses of Goursat's theorem can be weakened significantly.  If  is continuous in an open set Ω and the partial derivatives of f with respect to x and y exist in Ω, and satisfy the Cauchy–Riemann equations throughout Ω, then f is holomorphic (and thus analytic).  This result is the Looman–Menchoff theorem.

The hypothesis that f obey the Cauchy–Riemann equations throughout the domain Ω is essential.  It is possible to construct a continuous function satisfying the Cauchy–Riemann equations at a point, but which is not analytic at the point (e.g., .  Similarly, some additional assumption is needed besides the Cauchy–Riemann equations (such as continuity), as the following example illustrates

which satisfies the Cauchy–Riemann equations everywhere, but fails to be continuous at z = 0.

Nevertheless, if a function satisfies the Cauchy–Riemann equations in an open set in a weak sense, then the function is analytic.  More precisely:
 If f(z) is locally integrable in an open domain Ω ⊂ C, and satisfies the Cauchy–Riemann equations weakly, then f agrees almost everywhere with an analytic function in Ω.

This is in fact a special case of a more general result on the regularity of solutions of hypoelliptic partial differential equations.

Several variables
There are Cauchy–Riemann equations, appropriately generalized, in the theory of several complex variables. They form a significant overdetermined system of PDEs. This is done using a straightforward generalization of the Wirtinger derivative, where the function in question is required to have the (partial) Wirtinger derivative with respect to each complex variable vanish.

Complex differential forms
As often formulated, the d-bar operator

annihilates holomorphic functions. This generalizes most directly the formulation

where

Bäcklund transform 
Viewed as conjugate harmonic functions, the Cauchy–Riemann equations are a simple example of a Bäcklund transform. More complicated, generally non-linear Bäcklund transforms, such as in the sine-Gordon equation, are of great interest in the theory of solitons and integrable systems.

Definition in Clifford algebra 
In Clifford algebra the complex number  is represented as  where . The function  is considered analytic if and only if , which can be calculated in the following way:

Hence, in traditional notation:

Conformal mappings in higher dimensions 
Let Ω be an open set in the Euclidean space Rn.  The equation for an orientation-preserving mapping  to be a conformal mapping (that is, angle-preserving) is that

where Df is the Jacobian matrix, with transpose , and I denotes the identity matrix.  For , this system is equivalent to the standard Cauchy–Riemann equations of complex variables, and the solutions are holomorphic functions.  In dimension , this is still sometimes called the Cauchy–Riemann system, and Liouville's theorem implies, under suitable smoothness assumptions, that any such mapping is a Möbius transformation.

See also
List of complex analysis topics
Morera's theorem
Wirtinger derivatives

References

Sources

Further reading

External links 
 
 Cauchy–Riemann Equations Module by John H. Mathews

Partial differential equations
Complex analysis
Harmonic functions
Bernhard Riemann
Augustin-Louis Cauchy